is Toei Company's eighth installment in the Super Sentai metaseries. Its 51 episodes aired on TV Asahi from February 4, 1984, to January 26, 1985, replacing Kagaku Sentai Dynaman and was replaced by Dengeki Sentai Changeman with a movie being released during the show's initial run.

It is the first Super Sentai series to have two females in the main five as well as the first Super Sentai series to have a female Yellow Ranger. It was also the last series to have a Ranger change mid-season. The international English title is listed by Toei as Bioman. In the Philippines, Bioman was aired on ABS-CBN from 1987 to 1988 and in France on Canal+ in 1985, dubbed in English and French respectively.

Synopsis
The once prosperous  is destroyed after a world war erupted over the use of a scientific discovery called "Bio Particles". The , which sought to use Bio Particles for peaceful purposes, sends the giant robot Bio Robo and an assistant robot named Peebo to prevent the same tragedy from happening on Earth. Bio Robo arrives in 15th century Japan, where it showers Bio Particles on five young individuals. Five centuries later, the descendants of these individuals, infused with Bio Particles, are chosen by Peebo and Bio Robo to become the Bioman team to protect the Earth from the Neo-Empire Gear, an organization led by mad scientist Doctor Man.

Characters

Bioman
To transform individually they call their color and number and to transform as a group they call Bioman. Along with their , a versatile sidearm with sword, dagger, and blaster modes, the Bioman have a variety of team attacks that are executed after their Bio Brain Computers are synched up.

: Shirō Gō is the pilot of the first Japanese space shuttle before getting caught in the crossfire just as the Gear begins the invasion. In him, passion and responsibility unite. He grew up believing that his father was dead. However, after meeting Professor Shibata, he is not so sure. The Bio Particles within him enable him to communicate with animals; thus making them useful in reconnaissance missions. His Bio Brain Computer allows him to target any opponent with his  ability.
: Shingo Takasugi is a race car driver. Shingo can be very tough to enemies yet very kind to children. Despite his bravado, there are times when he doubts his abilities. Despite these doubts, he knows what he must do and does his best. He is the designated driver of Bio Turbo. His Bio Brain Computer allows him to use his  ability to see through any deception.
: Ryūta Nanbara is a water sportsman who is boyish and adventurous. He loves to explore and discover new things. His years of diving have made him very nimble and is skilled in stealth techniques. He can't tolerate bullies considering he used to be one. His Bio Brain Computer allows him to use his  ability to enhance his sense of hearing.
: The fourth member of the Bioman team whose moniker was used by its original user and her successor.
: Mika Koizumi was a photographer who dreams of following in her late brother's footsteps to photograph African wildlife. Initially, she is hesitant to join the team until she is convinced that Gear's evil would eventually put the animals in danger. When Gear manage to gather a bit of Anti-Bio Particles to weaponize, Mika dies by Pysgorn's hand sacrificing herself to empty the Bio Killer Gun's ammo so her allies can fight without being poisoned by the Anti-Bio Particles. The others mourn her as Bio Robo activates her Bio-Brain Computer to present her memories to give the Bioman hope. Her Bio Brain Computer allows her to present photographic projections in her  ability. Her special attack is Strobe Flash.
: Jun Yabuki is an Olympic archer. Sometimes dressing up in a hybrid American Indian cowgirl/feudal Japan outfit. The last two letters in her surname "ki" form the kanji for her color. After watching Bioman in action, she tries to join them, but is initially refused due to her lack of understanding how serious the fight is. However, her fearlessness enabled the Bioman to learn that she is also a descendant of the original Bioman. When she accidentally injures Shirō during the Samecanth incident, Jun is confronted by her old squad captain who learns of her reasons for leaving the Olympic archery team and allows her to remain with the Bioman.
: Hikaru Katsuragi is a carnival flutist. She is sweet yet strong and is a mistress of disguise. She bears an unusually strong spirit with a strong motherly instinct. She plays the flute to calm her spirits and to strengthen her resolve. She is able to befriend the evil computer Brain and teach him about friendship, which pays off when Brain sacrifices himself to save the Bioman and the world from destruction. She is the most emotional member of the team. Her Bio Brain Computer allows her to use her  ability.

Vehicles
: The motorcycles piloted by Red One (with a cruising speed of 300 kilometers per hour and a top speed of 540 kilometers per hour) and Yellow Four (with a cruising speed of 250 kilometers per hour and a top speed of 450 kilometers per hour).
: A modified Mazda RX-7 piloted by Green Two, Blue Three and Pink Five. It has a cruising speed of 350 km/h and a top speed of 630 kilometers per hour.

Mecha
: A carrier ship for Bio Jets One and Two. The fuselage side carries two laser guns. With its magnetic force crane, it can pick up an inert Bio Robo. It can transport a fully formed Bio Robo to the scene of battle. The Bioman can either pilot it out of the hangar, fly up to it, or board it from the ground with a tube-shaped escalator device.
: Coming from Planet Bio 500 years ago, Bio Robo is a semi sentient robot that showered five people with Bio Particles upon arriving on Earth around the time of Feudal Japan. Years later, Bio Robo activates upon detecting Gear's attacks and gathers the Bioman team. It is formed from the two Bio Jets when the command  is given. It uses a powered up attack, the  against later monsters.
: It is used by Red One and Pink Five, forming the upper half of the Bio Robo. It reappeared in Gaoranger Vs. Super Sentai.
: It is used by three other Bioman, Green Two, Blue Three and Yellow Four, forming the lower half of the Bio Robo.

Allies
: An android who is the guardian of the Bio Particles, the Bio Robo and the Bio Dragon, built as an experimental robot when the Bio Particles were in development. He came to Earth 500 years ago and showered five courageous people with Bio Particles. Now that Gear has made its move, Peebo and the Bio Robo gather the descendants of the original five. He shows a great fear for Silva. In the last two episodes, he used himself to energize the Bio Robo.
: Thinking himself an orphan, named , he learns he is in reality Shūichi Kageyama, the son of Doctor Man and basis of the design of Prince. At first, Doctor Man tries to get him to join Gear, but Shūichi rejects his father. Eventually, Shūichi finds and joins Doctor Shibata. Later, he helps the Bioman ultimately defeat Gear. He manages to convince Doctor Man to help them stop the bomb that could destroy the whole Earth through the use of human emotions.
: The former wife of Doctor Kageyama and the mother of Shūichi. After Kageyama became Doctor Man, she left her husband and gave away their son Shūichi for adoption by the Nakamura family. 17 years later, the Bioman team and Shūichi stumble onto a letter she left behind, along with a video recording, which revealed Doctor Man's true identity. She never actually appears in the series besides a photograph of herself with Kageyama and Shūichi as an infant, and a voice-over while Shūichi reads her letter.
: The estranged father of Shiro and the former research partner of Hideo Kageyama. After Kageyama became insane, he faked his death and left his wife and son to stop his former friend. He turned himself into a cyborg like Doctor Man did to continue his research and overthrow the Neo-Empire Gear. He creates a "conscience circuit" that is capable of giving Mecha Clones free will.
: A young friend of Peebo from Planet Bio. He recorded a video message on a compact disc addressed to Peebo that was sent to Earth from Bio Star before its destruction. Doctor Man managed to get a hold of the disc before Peebo does and decides to create a Mecha Clone of Joy in order to trick Peebo into revealing the location of the headquarters of the Biomen. Peebo is deceived by the duplicate at first, but manages to see through the deception after he views the video recording of Joy, which revealed that the real Joy was unable to escape the destruction of the Planet Bio and that he recorded the video as his final farewell to Peebo. Doctor Man, who did not understand the language of the people of Planet Bio, did not realize that Joy was already dead.
: The former coach of Jun and the captain of the Japanese Olympic Archery Team. He tries to investigate Jun's sudden departure from the team in order to convince her to return, only to discover Jun's secret identity as Yellow Four and allows her to remain with the Bioman.
: A protector of nature who lives in Mount Nekura by himself. When the Bioman team first encounter Yamamori, Shiro ponders the possibility of whether Yamamori might carry Bio Particles within him. After falling in love with Jun, Yamamori tries to join the team desperately, but is ultimately rejected when Bio Robo finds no traces of Bio Particles within his body. However, Yamamori manages to break free of Gear's influence and helps the Bioman team destroy the Magne Megas. Yamamori is considered a prototype of the "sixth ranger" additions featured in later Super Sentai shows.
: A special Mecha Clone developed by Doctor Man to be coupled with Satan Megas in episodes 43 and 44, Miki had the unusual appearance of a young girl in school uniform. As long as she existed, Satan Megas was able to re-assemble himself indefinitely, making him virtually invincible. After being implanted with the conscience circuit of Professor Shibata, however, Miki felt guilt for the ravages caused by Gear, and self-destructed so Bio Robo could defeat Satan Megas.

Neo-Empire Gear
The  was founded and led by the cyborg Doctor Man, from his Neo-Cloud fortress at the South Pole. Gear's forces believe themselves to be a technologically advanced society with the right to rule Earth.

: The supreme ruler of Gear, Doctor Man was actually a human named  who experimented on himself to accelerate his intelligence, only to have his body rapidly age in the process. To extend his life, Kageyama converted himself into a cyborg with a deep disgust for humanity, planning to conquer the world with his army of Mecha Clones while remaining alive long enough to find a worthy heir to his empire. When his true origins are revealed, Doctor Man countered the coup with a Mecha Clone copy of himself and later reprogrammed the Big Three and reorganized the empire. With his empire dying, he goes and fights the Bioman with King Megas only to be defeated. He activated the Anti-Bio Bomb but he ended up stopping it when his son and the Bioman prodded him eventually resulting in his death.
: He first appeared to Mason in the test mission to steal some gas, calling himself the son of Doctor Man where he blew up the power plant. As he was introduced as the son of Doctor Man, Doctor Man was revealed to be a human being. Ryuta wanted to stop him for his own well-being since he was only 17 years old. It was also revealed that the tentacles used to steal fuel were part of his creation, Grotesquekans. Later on, it was revealed that he was just a Mecha Clone created in Doctor Man's missing son's image of Shuichi after Mason and Farrah were tasked to return him to base. Because of that, Doctor Man reprogrammed him to be just Battle Mecha Prince where he challenged the Biomen for the final time. Ryuta accepted he could not be helped and the Biomen defeated him when his robot Grotesque Kans was destroyed.
 : The leader of the Big Three, three android generals who supervise field missions, also able to disguise themselves as humans, and the first of the trio to battle the Bioman, the frequent rival of Red One. Given the Bio Killer Gun, Mason only managed to kill Mika (the first Yellow Four) when she intentionally had him empty out all his Anti-Bio Particle ammo on her while he wanted to kill Shiro. He once plotted against Doctor Man himself upon learning his origins. He is armed with a staff which fires energy bolts which was later broken in half by Red One. He later fired an energy bolt to Red One from his chest after his staff was broken. Doctor Man apparently puts more importance on him than the other two. He later shares a close relationship with Farrah. He was later rebuilt and armed with Mason Rockets and Mason Machine Gun. He was eventually killed by Silva, praising Doctor Man one final time before he explodes.
: The female member of the Big Three, she uses beam weapons and leaves the dirty fighting to Farrah Cat. She often disguises herself as human in her schemes, favoring cunning and deception above brutal force.  She used to show resentment towards Mason but later developed a close relationship with him starting with the plot to steal gold bars which Mason designed. Later rebuilt and armed with Farrah Fire Storm and Farrah Kiss (blows an explosive flying kiss). She is rivals with Yellow Four and Pink Five. She died after receiving damage in battle while piloting Balzion.
: The brute of the Big Three who uses a battle axe as his usual weapon of choice, though he can use nearby heavy objects in his fights as well. He usually works with Zyuoh. He was later upgraded and armed with Black Mace and Iron Paw. Despite being an android, he is revealed to have feelings for Farrah which she resents and Mason considers it disgusting. He was killed while trying to capture Balzion in Super Megas.

Jyunoids
The  are mechanical monsters that fight the Biomen and support the Big Three in their battles.
: A three faced psychic monster with the ability to spew fire and uses telekinesis and teleportation, normally working with Mason and Farrah. He is the mightiest of the Jyunoids as he caused serious problems to the Biomen in battle, playing a role in Mika's death. Later upgraded with energy beams and stronger fire powers.  He is the last Jyunoid to be killed and was destroyed by heavy damage caused by Red One and the Biomen, while trying to protect Mason of which he could be heard telling the latter to get away.
:  A biomechanical one-eyed Jyunoid, armed with a rapier and clawed arm, able to create holograms and turn himself into a slime to evade attacks or sneak attack his opponent. He usually works with Farrah, later upgraded with her to be able to stretch his limbs at the same time Farrah was upgraded. He was destroyed after an overdose of Bio Killer Energy from Silva and receiving the Bio Electron Charge attack while trying to shield Farrah.
: He is a gorilla-like robot that generally works alongside Monster, being a dim-witted brute armed with a mace and able to use his finger cannons in battle. As a result, Jyuoh is loyal to Monster to the point of coming to the aid of his master. After being heavily damaged in battle, Jyuoh was rebuilt for his loyalty at the request of his master with chest cannons. He works as the acting leader in the movie. He was destroyed after receiving heavy damage from Silva and the Biomen.
: A falcon-faced gargoyle robot with the ability to fly and armed with supersonic waves and laser energy beams. He usually supports Farrah and Mason, although at one point worked with Monster. Messarjū was the first of the Jyunoids to be destroyed.
: A Gill-man robot armed with a harpoon-gun and built-in Bubble Bombs and Acid Spray. Usually working with Farrah and Mason, Aquaiger is the weakest of the Beastnoids to the point of getting beat down by the other Jyunoids. He was one of the first Jyunoids to be destroyed fighting the Biomen.

Others
: Farrah's android bodyguard who does the dirty work, dressed in black and purple skins, she is quick, agile and acrobatic. She has claws for weapons and uses twin nunchukus as well. She eventually meets her end when Yellow Four and Pink Five blew off her circuits with a full blast.
: The robotic foot soldiers of Gear. They have black bodies with red eyes, and silver masks that hide their mechanical faces. Their arms include swords and guns. Mecha Clones can be programmed to pilot Mechadrone jet fighters or act as laboratory assistants. They can also disguise themselves as humans and are armed with explosives for suicide missions.

Silva
However, Silva malfunctions and uses his mecha  to destroy Planet Bio. Tracking the Bio Particle signature of Peebo and the Bio Robo, Silva arrives on Earth to complete his objective. Though an arch-enemy of the Bioman, Silva is also at odds with Gear who desire to utilize Balzion's technology for their own use. Losing his robot, Silva retrieves Balzion while killing Mason. In the end, Silva is destroyed when Balzion was defeated by a sudden charge of Bio Energy from the Bio Robo.

Episodes

Movie
A movie version of Chōdenshi Bioman premiered at the Toei Manga Matsuri film festival on July 14, 1984, the same day episode 24 aired. It was directed by Nagafumi Hori and written by Hirohisa Soda, who both worked on the series. The events of the movie are set somewhere between Episodes 11 and 31 due to the presence of Jun Yabuki as Yellow Four and the appearance of all five Beastnoids.

International broadcasts

Asia
Bioman aired in the Philippines on ABS-CBN from 1987 to 1988 and IBC from 1993 to 1994. It was also one of the last tokusatsu programs in the Philippines to be dubbed in English, as Space Sheriff Shaider which was aired in 1987 by rival GMA Network, starting the trend of dubbing tokusatsu in Filipino. In recent years, Bioman was re-broadcast and re-dubbed in Filipino. The series also aired on Channel 7 in Thailand. It was aired in South Korea under the title Space Commando Bioman.

Europe
The series was very popular in France, being first aired in Canal+ in 1985, every Saturday at 12:30, and later on TF1, on the programme Club Dorothée, from September 2, 1987, with singer/actor Bernard Minet recording a French version of the show's theme for that country. It also was released dubbed on video in Greece.

United States
In 1986, Haim Saban produced a pilot episode of an American adaptation of the series simply titled Bio-Man. This show involved 5 rangers with a prototype Alpha 5 based on Peebo. Saban pitched to many TV stations, however, with no interest from any stations, the show was never picked up. However the idea would resurface into Mighty Morphin Power Rangers.

Cast
 Shirō Gō: 
 Shingo Takasugi: 
 Ryūta Nanbara: 
 Mika Koizumi: 
 Jun Yabuki: 
 Hikaru Katsuragi: 
 Doctor Shibata: 
 Shūichi Kageyama, Prince: 
 Doctor Man: 
 Meison: 
 Farrah: 
 Farrah Cat: 
 Monster:

Voice actors
 Peebo: 
 Mettzler: 
 Jyuoh: 
 Psygorn: 
 Aquaiger: 
 Messarju: 
 Bio Hunter Silva: 
 Narrator:

English pilot cast
 Mark Dacascos as Victor Lee/Biorhythm Red
 Miguel Núñez as Zack Taylor/Biorhythm Green
 Tom Silardi as Billy Cranston/Biorhythm Blue
 Tricia Leigh Fisher as Trini Crystal/Biorhythm Yellow
 Rebecca Staples as Kimberly Harte/Biorhythm Pink

Songs

Opening theme
 
 Lyrics: 
 Composition: 
 Arrangement: 
 Artist:

Ending theme
 
 Lyrics: Kang Jin-hwa
 Composition: Kunihiko Kase
 Arrangement: Tatsumi Yano
 Artist: Takayuki Miyauchi

References

External links
 スーパー戦隊百科：超電子バイオマン 

1984 Japanese television series debuts
1985 Japanese television series endings
Super Sentai
TV Asahi original programming